Voyager 1 is a space probe launched by NASA on September 5, 1977, as part of the Voyager program to study the outer Solar System and interstellar space beyond the Sun's heliosphere. It communicates through NASA's Deep Space Network to receive routine commands and to transmit data to Earth. Real-time distance and velocity data is provided by NASA and JPL.

The probe made flybys of Jupiter, Saturn, and Saturn's largest moon, Titan. NASA had a choice of either doing a Pluto or Titan flyby; exploration of the moon took priority because it was known to have a substantial atmosphere. Voyager 1 studied the weather, magnetic fields, and rings of the two gas giants and was the first probe to provide detailed images of their moons.

As part of the Voyager program and like its sister craft Voyager 2, the spacecraft's extended mission is to locate and study the regions and boundaries of the outer heliosphere and to begin exploring the interstellar medium. Voyager 1 crossed the heliopause and entered interstellar space on August 25, 2012, making it the first spacecraft to do so. Two years later, Voyager 1 began experiencing a third "tsunami wave" of coronal mass ejections from the Sun that continued to at least December 15, 2014, further confirming that the probe is indeed in interstellar space.

In a further testament to the robustness of Voyager 1, the Voyager team tested the spacecraft's trajectory correction maneuver (TCM) thrusters in late 2017 (the first time these thrusters had been fired since 1980), a project enabling the mission to be extended by two to three years. Voyager 1s extended mission is expected to continue until about 2025, when its radioisotope thermoelectric generators (RTGs) will no longer supply enough electric power to operate its scientific instruments.

Mission background

History 
In the 1960s, a Grand Tour to study the outer planets was proposed which prompted NASA to begin work on a mission in the early 1970s. Information gathered by the Pioneer 10 spacecraft helped Voyager's engineers design Voyager to cope more effectively with the intense radiation environment around Jupiter. However, shortly before launch, strips of kitchen-grade aluminum foil were applied to certain cabling to further enhance radiation shielding.

Initially, Voyager 1 was planned as "Mariner 11" of the Mariner program. Due to budget cuts, the mission was scaled back to be a flyby of Jupiter and Saturn and renamed the Mariner Jupiter-Saturn probes. As the program progressed, the name was later changed to Voyager, since the probe designs began to differ greatly from previous Mariner missions.

Spacecraft components 

Voyager 1 was constructed by the Jet Propulsion Laboratory. It has 16 hydrazine thrusters, three-axis stabilization gyroscopes, and referencing instruments to keep the probe's radio antenna pointed toward Earth. Collectively, these instruments are part of the Attitude and Articulation Control Subsystem (AACS), along with redundant units of most instruments and 8 backup thrusters. The spacecraft also included 11 scientific instruments to study celestial objects such as planets as it travels through space.

Communication system 

The radio communication system of Voyager 1 was designed to be used up to and beyond the limits of the Solar System. The craft normally transmits data to Earth over Deep Space Network Channel 18, using a frequency of either 2.3 GHz or 8.4 GHz, while signals from Earth to Voyager are transmitted at 2.1 GHz.

When Voyager 1 is unable to communicate directly with the Earth, its digital tape recorder (DTR) can record about 67 megabytes of data for transmission a later time.  signals from Voyager 1 take over 21 hours to reach Earth.

Power 
Voyager 1 has three radioisotope thermoelectric generators (RTGs) mounted on a boom. Each MHW-RTG contains 24 pressed plutonium-238 oxide spheres. The RTGs generated about 470 W of electric power at the time of launch, with the remainder being dissipated as waste heat. The power output of the RTGs declines over time due to the 87.7-year half-life of the fuel and degradation of the thermocouples, but the craft's RTGs will continue to support some of its operations until 2025.

Computers 
Unlike the other onboard instruments, the operation of the cameras for visible light is not autonomous, but rather it is controlled by an imaging parameter table contained in one of the on-board digital computers, the Flight Data Subsystem (FDS). Since the 1990s, most space probes have been equipped with completely autonomous cameras.

The computer command subsystem (CCS) controls the cameras. The CCS contains fixed computer programs, such as command decoding, fault-detection and fault-correction routines, antenna pointing routines, and spacecraft sequencing routines. This computer is an improved version of the one that was used in the 1970s Viking orbiters.

The Attitude and Articulation Control Subsystem (AACS) controls the spacecraft orientation (its attitude). It keeps the high-gain antenna pointing towards the Earth, controls attitude changes, and points the scan platform. The custom-built AACS systems on both Voyagers are the same.

Scientific instruments 

For more details on the Voyager space probes' identical instrument packages, see the separate article on the overall Voyager Program.

Mission profile

Timeline of travel

Launch and trajectory 

The Voyager 1 probe was launched on September 5, 1977, from Launch Complex 41 at the Cape Canaveral Air Force Station, aboard a Titan IIIE launch vehicle. The Voyager 2 probe had been launched two weeks earlier, on August 20, 1977. Despite being launched later, Voyager 1 reached both Jupiter and Saturn sooner, following a shorter trajectory.

Flyby of Jupiter 

Voyager 1 began photographing Jupiter in January 1979. Because of the greater photographic resolution allowed by a closer approach, most observations of the moons, rings, magnetic fields, and the radiation belt environment of the Jovian system were made during the 48-hour period that bracketed the closest approach. Voyager 1 finished photographing the Jovian system in April 1979.

The discovery of ongoing volcanic activity on the moon Io was probably the greatest surprise. It was the first time active volcanoes had been seen on another body in the Solar System. It appears that activity on Io affects the entire Jovian system. Io appears to be the primary source of matter that pervades the Jovian magnetosphere – the region of space that surrounds the planet influenced by the planet's strong magnetic field. Sulfur, oxygen, and sodium, apparently erupted by Io's volcanoes and sputtered off the surface by the impact of high-energy particles, were detected at the outer edge of the magnetosphere of Jupiter.

The two Voyager space probes made a number of important discoveries about Jupiter, its satellites, its radiation belts, and its never-before-seen planetary rings.

Flyby of Saturn 

The gravitational assist trajectories at Jupiter were successfully carried out by both Voyagers, and the two spacecraft went on to visit Saturn and its system of moons and rings. Voyager 1 encountered Saturn in November 1980, with the closest approach on November 12, 1980, when the space probe came within  of Saturn's cloud-tops. The space probe's cameras detected complex structures in the rings of Saturn, and its remote sensing instruments studied the atmospheres of Saturn and its giant moon Titan.

Voyager 1 found that about seven percent of the volume of Saturn's upper atmosphere is helium (compared with 11 percent of Jupiter's atmosphere), while almost all the rest is hydrogen. Since Saturn's internal helium abundance was expected to be the same as Jupiter's and the Sun's, the lower abundance of helium in the upper atmosphere may imply that the heavier helium may be slowly sinking through Saturn's hydrogen; that might explain the excess heat that Saturn radiates over energy it receives from the Sun. Winds blow at high speeds on Saturn. The wind blows mostly in an easterly direction.

The Voyagers found aurora-like ultraviolet emissions of hydrogen at mid-latitudes in the atmosphere, and auroras at polar latitudes (above 65 degrees). The high-level auroral activity may lead to the formation of complex hydrocarbon molecules that are carried toward the equator. The mid-latitude auroras, which occur only in sunlit regions, remain a puzzle, since bombardment by electrons and ions, known to cause auroras on Earth, occurs primarily at high latitudes. Both Voyagers measured the rotation of Saturn (the length of a day) at 10 hours, 39 minutes, 24 seconds.

Voyager 1s mission included a flyby of Titan, Saturn's largest moon, which had long been known to have an atmosphere. Images taken by Pioneer 11 in 1979 had indicated the atmosphere was substantial and complex, further increasing interest. The Titan flyby occurred as the spacecraft entered the system to avoid any possibility of damage closer to Saturn compromising observations, and approached to within , passing behind Titan as seen from Earth and the Sun. Voyager's measurement of the atmosphere's effect on sunlight and Earth-based measurement of its effect on the probe's radio signal were used to determine the atmosphere's composition, density, and pressure. Titan's mass was also measured by observing its effect on the probe's trajectory. The thick haze prevented any visual observation of the surface, but the measurement of the atmosphere's composition, temperature, and pressure led to speculation that lakes of liquid hydrocarbons could exist on the surface.

Because observations of Titan were considered vital, the trajectory chosen for Voyager 1 was designed around the optimum Titan flyby, which took it below the south pole of Saturn and out of the plane of the ecliptic, ending its planetary science mission. Had Voyager 1 failed or been unable to observe Titan, Voyager 2's trajectory would have been altered to incorporate the Titan flyby, precluding any visit to Uranus and Neptune. The trajectory Voyager 1 was launched into would not have allowed it to continue on to Uranus and Neptune, but could have been altered to avoid a Titan flyby and travel from Saturn to Pluto, arriving in 1986.

Exit from the heliosphere 

On February 14, 1990, Voyager 1 took the first "family portrait" of the Solar System as seen from outside, which includes the image of planet Earth known as Pale Blue Dot. Soon afterward, its cameras were deactivated to conserve energy and computer resources for other equipment. The camera software has been removed from the spacecraft, so it would now be complex to get them working again. Earth-side software and computers for reading the images are also no longer available.

As Voyager 1 headed for interstellar space, its instruments continued to study the Solar System. Jet Propulsion Laboratory scientists used the plasma wave experiments aboard Voyager 1 and 2 to look for the heliopause, the boundary at which the solar wind transitions into the interstellar medium.

Termination shock 

Scientists at the Johns Hopkins University Applied Physics Laboratory believe that Voyager 1 entered the termination shock in February 2003. This marks the point where the solar wind slows to subsonic speeds. Some other scientists expressed doubt and discussed this in the journal Nature of November 6, 2003. The issue would not be resolved until other data became available, since Voyager 1 solar-wind detector ceased functioning in 1990. This failure meant that termination shock detection would have to be inferred from the data from the other instruments on board.

In May 2005, a NASA press release said that the consensus was that Voyager 1 was then in the heliosheath. In a scientific session at the American Geophysical Union meeting in New Orleans on May 25, 2005, Ed Stone presented evidence that the craft crossed the termination shock in late 2004.

Heliosheath 

On March 31, 2006, amateur radio operators from AMSAT in Germany tracked and received radio waves from Voyager 1 using the  dish at Bochum with a long integration technique. Retrieved data was checked and verified against data from the Deep Space Network station at Madrid, Spain. This seems to be the first such amateur tracking of Voyager 1.

It was confirmed on December 13, 2010, that Voyager 1 had passed the reach of the radial outward flow of the solar wind, as measured by the Low Energy Charged Particle device. It is suspected that solar wind at this distance turns sideways because of interstellar wind pushing against the heliosphere. Since June 2010, detection of solar wind had been consistently at zero, providing conclusive evidence of the event.

Voyager 1 was commanded to change its orientation to measure the sideways motion of the solar wind at that location in space in March 2011 (~33yr 6mo from launch). A test roll done in February had confirmed the spacecraft's ability to maneuver and reorient itself. The course of the spacecraft was not changed. It rotated 70 degrees counterclockwise with respect to Earth to detect the solar wind. This was the first time the spacecraft had done any major maneuvering since the Family Portrait photograph of the planets was taken in 1990. After the first roll the spacecraft had no problem in reorienting itself with Alpha Centauri, Voyager 1's guide star, and it resumed sending transmissions back to Earth. Voyager 1 was expected to enter interstellar space "at any time". Voyager 2 was still detecting outward flow of solar wind at that point but it was estimated that in the following months or years it would experience the same conditions as Voyager 1.

The spacecraft was reported at 12.44° declination and 17.163 hours right ascension, and at an ecliptic latitude of 34.9° (the ecliptic latitude changes very slowly), placing it in the constellation Ophiuchus as observed from the Earth on May 21, 2011.

On December 1, 2011, it was announced that Voyager 1 had detected the first Lyman-alpha radiation originating from the Milky Way galaxy. Lyman-alpha radiation had previously been detected from other galaxies, but because of interference from the Sun, the radiation from the Milky Way was not detectable.

NASA announced on December 5, 2011, that Voyager 1 had entered a new region referred to as a "cosmic purgatory". Within this stagnation region, charged particles streaming from the Sun slow and turn inward, and the Solar System's magnetic field is doubled in strength as interstellar space appears to be applying pressure. Energetic particles originating in the Solar System decline by nearly half, while the detection of high-energy electrons from outside increases 100-fold. The inner edge of the stagnation region is located approximately 113 AU from the Sun.

Heliopause 
NASA announced in June 2012 that the probe was detecting changes in the environment that were suspected to correlate with arrival at the heliopause. Voyager 1 had reported a marked increase in its detection of charged particles from interstellar space, which are normally deflected by the solar winds within the heliosphere from the Sun. The craft thus began to enter the interstellar medium at the edge of the Solar System.

As of September 2012, sunlight took 16.89 hours to get to Voyager 1 which was at a distance of 121 AU. The apparent magnitude of the Sun from the spacecraft was -16.3 (about 30 times brighter than the full Moon). The spacecraft was traveling at  relative to the Sun. At this rate, it would need about 17,565 years at this speed to travel a single light-year. To compare, Proxima Centauri, the closest star to the Sun, is about 4.2 light-years distant. If the spacecraft was traveling in the direction of that star, it would take 73,775 years to reach it. (Voyager 1 is heading in the direction of the constellation Ophiuchus.)

In late 2012, researchers reported that particle data from the spacecraft suggested that the probe had passed through the heliopause. Measurements from the spacecraft revealed a steady rise since May in collisions with high energy particles (above 70 MeV), which are thought to be cosmic rays emanating from supernova explosions far beyond the Solar System, with a sharp increase in these collisions in late August. At the same time, in late August, there was a dramatic drop in collisions with low-energy particles, which are thought to originate from the Sun.

Ed Roelof, space scientist at Johns Hopkins University and principal investigator for the Low-Energy Charged Particle instrument on the spacecraft, declared that "most scientists involved with Voyager 1 would agree that [these two criteria] have been sufficiently satisfied". However, the last criterion for officially declaring that Voyager 1 had crossed the boundary, the expected change in magnetic field direction (from that of the Sun to that of the interstellar field beyond), had not been observed (the field had changed direction by only 2 degrees), which suggested to some that the nature of the edge of the heliosphere had been misjudged.

On December 3, 2012, Voyager project scientist Ed Stone of the California Institute of Technology said, "Voyager has discovered a new region of the heliosphere that we had not realized was there. We're still inside, apparently. But the magnetic field now is connected to the outside. So it's like a highway letting particles in and out." The magnetic field in this region was 10 times more intense than Voyager 1 encountered before the termination shock. It was expected to be the last barrier before the spacecraft exited the Solar System completely and entered interstellar space.

Interstellar medium 
In March 2013, it was announced that Voyager 1 might have become the first spacecraft to enter interstellar space, having detected a marked change in the plasma environment on August 25, 2012. However, until September 12, 2013, it was still an open question as to whether the new region was interstellar space or an unknown region of the Solar System. At that time, the former alternative was officially confirmed.

Each year, Voyager 1 increases its lead over Voyager 2.

Its progress can be monitored at NASA's website (see § External links).

On September 12, 2013, NASA officially confirmed that Voyager 1 had reached the interstellar medium in August 2012 as previously observed. The generally accepted date of arrival is August 25, 2012 (approximately 10 days before the 35th anniversary of its launch), the date durable changes in the density of energetic particles were first detected. By this point, most space scientists had abandoned the hypothesis that a change in magnetic field direction must accompany a crossing of the heliopause; a new model of the heliopause predicted that no such change would be found.

A key finding that persuaded many scientists that the heliopause had been crossed was an indirect measurement of an 80-fold increase in electron density, based on the frequency of plasma oscillations observed beginning on April 9, 2013, triggered by a solar outburst that had occurred in March 2012 (electron density is expected to be two orders of magnitude higher outside the heliopause than within). Weaker sets of oscillations measured in October and November 2012 provided additional data. An indirect measurement was required because Voyager 1's plasma spectrometer had stopped working in 1980. In September 2013, NASA released recordings of audio transductions of these plasma waves, the first to be measured in interstellar space.

While Voyager 1 is commonly spoken of as having left the Solar System simultaneously with having left the heliosphere, the two are not the same. The Solar System is usually defined as the vastly larger region of space populated by bodies that orbit the Sun. The craft is presently less than one-seventh the distance to the aphelion of Sedna, and it has not yet entered the Oort cloud, the source region of long-period comets, regarded by astronomers as the outermost zone of the Solar System.

In October 2020, astronomers reported a significant unexpected increase in density in the space beyond the Solar System as detected by the Voyager 1 and Voyager 2 space probes. According to the researchers, this implies that "the density gradient is a large-scale feature of the VLISM (very local interstellar medium) in the general direction of the heliospheric nose".

In May 2021, NASA reported on the continuous measurement, for the first time, of the density of material in interstellar space and, as well, the detection of interstellar sounds for the first time.

In May 2022, NASA reported that Voyager 1 had begun transmitting "mysterious" and "peculiar" telemetric data to the Deep Space Network (DSN). It confirmed that the operational status of the craft remained unchanged, but that the issue stemmed from the Attitude Articulation and Control System (AACS). NASA's Jet Propulsion Laboratory (JPL) published a statement on May 18, 2022, that the AACS was functional but sending invalid data. The problem was eventually traced to the AACS sending its telemetry through a computer that had been non-operational for years, resulting in data corruption. In August 2022, NASA transmitted a command to the AACS to utilize another computer, which resolved the problem. An investigation into what caused the initial switch is underway, though engineers have hypothesized that the AACS had executed a bad command from another onboard computer.

Future of the probe

Remaining lifespan

In December 2017, NASA successfully fired all four of Voyager 1s trajectory correction maneuver (TCM) thrusters for the first time since 1980. The TCM thrusters were used in the place of a degraded set of jets to help keep the probe's antenna pointed towards the Earth. Use of the TCM thrusters allowed Voyager 1 to continue to transmit data to NASA for two to three more years.

Due to the diminishing electrical power available, the Voyager team has had to prioritize which instruments to keep on and which to turn off. Heaters and other spacecraft systems have been turned off one by one as part of power management. The fields and particles instruments that are the most likely to send back key data about the heliosphere and interstellar space have been prioritized to keep operating. Engineers expect the spacecraft to continue operating at least one science instrument until around 2025.

Far future

Provided Voyager 1 does not collide with anything and is not retrieved, the New Horizons space probe will never pass it, despite being launched from Earth at a higher speed than either Voyager spacecraft. The Voyager spacecraft benefited from multiple planetary flybys to increase its heliocentric velocities, whereas New Horizons received only a single such boost, from its Jupiter flyby.

Voyager 1 is expected to reach the theorized Oort cloud in about 300 years and take about 30,000 years to pass through it. Though it is not heading towards any particular star, in about 40,000 years, it will pass within  of the star Gliese 445, which is at present in the constellation Camelopardalis and 17.1 light-years from Earth. NASA says that "The Voyagers are destined—perhaps eternally—to wander the Milky Way." In 300,000 years, it will pass within less than 1 light year of the M3V star TYC 3135-52-1.

Golden record 

Each Voyager space probe carries a gold-plated audio-visual disc, should the spacecraft ever be found by intelligent life forms from other planetary systems. The disc carries photos of the Earth and its lifeforms, a range of scientific information, spoken greetings from people such as the Secretary-General of the United Nations and the President of the United States and a medley, "Sounds of Earth," that includes the sounds of whales, a baby crying, waves breaking on a shore, and a collection of music including works by Wolfgang Amadeus Mozart, Blind Willie Johnson, Chuck Berry and Valya Balkanska. Other Eastern and Western classics are included, as well as various performances of indigenous music from around the world. The record also contains greetings in 55 different languages.

See also

References

External links 

 NASA Voyager website
 Voyager 1 Mission Profile by NASA's Solar System Exploration
 Position of Voyager 1 (Live-Counter)
 Voyager 1 (NSSDC Master Catalog)
 Heavens-above.com: Spacecraft Escaping the Solar System – current positions and diagrams
 JPL Voyager Telecom Manual
 Voyager 1 Has Outdistanced the Solar Wind
 
 WebGL-based 3D artist's view of Voyager @ SPACECRAFTS 3D

NASA space probes
Missions to Saturn
Missions to Jupiter
Radio frequency propagation
Spacecraft escaping the Solar System
1977 in spaceflight
1977 in the United States
September 1977 events in the United States
1977 robots
Nuclear-powered robots
Spacecraft launched by Titan rockets
Spacecraft launched in 1977
Articles containing video clips
Individual space vehicles